Owen Patrick Bernard Corrigan (March 5, 1849 – April 8, 1929) was an American Roman Catholic clergyman who served as  Auxiliary Bishop of Baltimore, Maryland.

Biography
Owen Corrigan was born in Baltimore to John and Rosanna (née McDonald) Corrigan. After graduating from high school, he attended St. Charles College in Catonsville and St. Mary's Seminary in Baltimore. He continued his studies at the Pontifical North American College in Rome.

He was ordained to the priesthood by Cardinal Costantino Patrizi Naro on June 7, 1873. Following his return to Baltimore, he became pastor of St. Gregory the Great Church. He was named vicar general of the Archdiocese of Baltimore on July 6, 1908.

On September 29, 1908, Corrigan was appointed Auxiliary Bishop of Baltimore and Titular Bishop of Macri by Pope Pius X. He received his episcopal consecration on January 10, 1909 from Cardinal James Gibbons, with Bishops Maurice Francis Burke and Benjamin Joseph Keiley serving as co-consecrators, at the Cathedral of the Assumption. He served as an auxiliary bishop until his death twenty years later, at age 80. He is buried in Baltimore.

References

1849 births
1929 deaths
Religious leaders from Baltimore
20th-century Roman Catholic bishops in the United States
St. Charles College alumni